FC Nika Krasny Sulin was a Russian football team from Krasny Sulin. It played professionally in 1968–1970, 1992–1997 and 2008. Their best result was 11th place in the Zone South of the Russian Second Division in 2008.

Team name history
 1908–2001: FC Metallurg Krasny Sulin
 2007–2008: FC Nika Krasny Sulin

External links
  Team history at KLISF

Association football clubs established in 1908
Association football clubs disestablished in 2009
Defunct football clubs in Russia
Sport in Rostov Oblast
1908 establishments in the Russian Empire
2009 disestablishments in Russia